This is a list of films that reflect the criteria of the Deaf cinema movement:  written, produced or directed by deaf people  with leading deaf actors.  All these works have a tendency to nurture and develop the culture's self image and to reflect correctly the core of the Deaf culture and language.

List of films

List of documentaries

See also
 List of films featuring the deaf and hard of hearing

References

Bibliography

Deaf culture
Films about deaf people